Thistledown may refer to:

 The soft feathery material which protects the fruiting part of a thistle
 Thistledown (film), a 1938 British musical film
 Thistledown (racecourse), a thoroughbred racing track in North Randall, Ohio, near Cleveland
 Thistledown, Colorado
 Thistledown family, characters in The Dark Elf Trilogy by R. A. Salvatore
 Operation Thistledown, a World War II operation in Italy
 A fictional starship the novel series The Way by Greg Bear